In Concert is a live album by saxophonist Lee Konitz and trumpeter Chet Baker which was recorded in 1974 and released on the India Navigation label in 1982.

Reception 

The Allmusic review by Scott Yanow states: "The matchup of the cool-toned trumpeter Chet Baker with the advanced but equally mellow-toned altoist Lee Konitz (in a pianoless quartet with bassist Michael Moore and drummer Beaver Harris) was a very logical combination. .... Baker and Konitz very much inspired each other on this frequently superb and exciting set".

Track listing 
 "There Will Never Be Another You" (Harry Warren, Mack Gordon) – 9:54 Additional track on CD release
 "Airegin, (Sonny Rollins) – 9:23
 "Au Privave" (Charlie Parker) – 11:33
 "Just Friends" (John Klenner, Sam M. Lewis) – 6:25 Additional track on CD release
 "Body and Soul" (Johnny Green, Edward Heyman, Robert Sour, Frank Eyton) – 11:23
 "This Is Always" (Warren, Gordon) – 6:09 Additional track on CD release
 "Willow Weep for Me" (Ann Ronell) – 7:27
 "Walkin'" (Richard Carpenter) – 5:24

Personnel 
Chet Baker – trumpet, vocals
Lee Konitz – alto saxophone
Michael Moore – bass
Beaver Harris – drums

References 

Chet Baker live albums
Lee Konitz live albums
1982 live albums
India Navigation live albums
Collaborative albums